Barry Edward Johnson (1 Aug 1937  Woolwich, London, England – 5 May 2002 Newcastle upon Tyne, England) was an English mathematician who worked on operator algebras. He was elected a fellow of the Royal Society in 1978.

References

1937 births
2002 deaths
People from Woolwich
English mathematicians
Fellows of the Royal Society